George Birnie Esslemont (1860 – 2 October 1917) was a Scottish Liberal politician. He was elected as Member of Parliament for Aberdeen South in 1907, and held the seat until he resigned in 1917.

He married Clementine Macdonald who became President of the Aberdeen Women's Liberal Association. Their daughter was Mary Esslemont who became a leading doctor and was born in Aberdeen in 1891.

References

External links 
 

1860 births
1917 deaths
Scottish Liberal Party MPs
Members of the Parliament of the United Kingdom for Aberdeen constituencies
UK MPs 1906–1910
UK MPs 1910
UK MPs 1910–1918